Dora Beel is a wetland and lake located at Rampur no. 2 village under the Palashbari revenue circle and surrounded by villages like Rajapukhuri, Nahira, Bhakatpara, Tezpur, Rampur, Majpara, Kuldung, Dhantola, Bortari and Khidirpukhuri  in Kamrup district of Assam.

Area
According to the Survey of India, the total area of the Beel was 300.96 acres in 1971. However, it has shrunk to 278.41 acres according to land sat imagery in 2005.

Water source
Dora beel is fed by Kulsi River and Kulsi also acts as main inlet and outlet for the lake.

Aquafauna
Dora beel is the habitat of endangered South Asian river dolphin (Platanista gangetica).  This endangered dolphin (known as Xihu in Assamese language) breeds only in Subansiri River and Kulsi River of the entire Brahmaputra delta.

Festival
Dora Beel festival is an annual festival set on the banks of the Dora Beel to discuss about the production of indigenous fish species and this festival is fundamentally linked to nature and carries the eternal message of protecting and respecting nature.

See also
List of lakes of Assam

References

Lakes of Assam
Kamrup district